Nord-Fron is a municipality in Innlandet county, Norway. It is located in the traditional district of Gudbrandsdal. The administrative centre of the municipality is the town of Vinstra. Other population centers in Nord-Fron include the villages of Kvam and Skåbu.

The  municipality is the 95th largest by area out of the 356 municipalities in Norway. Nord-Fron is the 166th most populous municipality in Norway with a population of 5,628.

General information
The prestegjeld of Fron was established as a civil municipality on 1 January 1838 when the new formannskapsdistrikt law went into effect. On 1 January 1851, the municipality was divided in two. The northwest portion became Nord-Fron Municipality (population: 4,685) and the southeast portion became Sør-Fron Municipality (population: 3,421).

During the 1960s, there were many municipal mergers across Norway due to the work of the Schei Committee. On 1 January 1965, the Sjoa area (population: 413) was transferred from Nord-Fron to the neighboring Sel Municipality. Then, on 1 January 1966, the municipalities of Nord-Fron (population: 5,758) and Sør-Fron (population: 3,648) were merged to form a new Fron Municipality (with similar borders to the old Fron municipality that existed from 1838-1851 minus the Sjoa area which was then part of Sel).

This merger was not well-liked among the residents of the new municipality. On 1 January 1977, the merger was reversed and Nord-Fron (population: 6,131) and Sør-Fron (population: 3,509) were recreated using their old borders from 1965.

Name
The municipality (and the prestegjeld) of Fron was named after the old Fron farm ( since this was the site of the first Fron Church. The meaning of the name is unknown (maybe "earth" or "land"). The prefix of the name, Nord- means "north", hence the name of the municipality is "(the) northern (part of) Fron" (since the parish of Fron was divided in 1851 into a "north" and a "south" part).

Coat of arms
The coat of arms was granted on 18 July 1980. The arms show a gold-colored Dole Gudbrandsdal horse on a red background. The Fron area has a long-standing tradition in horse breeding and is one of the main centres of horse breeding in Norway. Historically, the old Fron municipality used unofficial arms with a horse on it. After Fron was divided into Nord- and Sør-Fron in 1977, Nord-Fron choose these arms.

Churches
The Church of Norway has four parishes within the municipality of Nord-Fron. It is part of the Nord-Gudbrandsdal prosti (deanery) in the Diocese of Hamar.

History

The Nord-Hoge farm in the Sødorp parish of Nord-Fron is the legendary home of Per Gynt. Per was made famous by both Peter Asbjørnsen's folk tales and Henrik Ibsen's play Peer Gynt.

The body of Captain Sinclair is buried in Kvam.

The small Kvam Church which was built in 1775, was burned down during the Occupation of Norway by Nazi Germany during World War II. It was rebuilt after the war.

Geography
Nord-Fron is bordered to the northwest by Sel municipality, to the east and south by Sør-Fron municipality, in the south by Øystre Slidre municipality, and in the southwest by Vågå municipality. The municipality stretches from the Rondane mountains in the north to the Jotunheimen mountains in the southwest.

There are two population main centers in Nord-Fron: the town of Vinstra in the central part of the municipality and the village of Kvam in the north. Kvam is located at the northern end of the Peer Gynt Road, which passes through high roads with excellent views of the Jotunheimen, Dovrefjell, and Rondane mountain.

Lakes in the region include Feforvatnet, Olstappen, Øyangen, and Sandvatnet/Kaldfjorden/Øyvatnet. Mountains in the region include Gravdalsknappen, Heimdalshøe, Hornflågene, Ingulssjøhøi, Saukampen, Sikkilsdalshøa, Styggehøe, and Smiubelgen.

Government
All municipalities in Norway, including Nord-Fron, are responsible for primary education (through 10th grade), outpatient health services, senior citizen services, unemployment and other social services, zoning, economic development, and municipal roads.  The municipality is governed by a municipal council of elected representatives, which in turn elects a mayor.  The municipality falls under the Vestre Innlandet District Court and the Eidsivating Court of Appeal.

Municipal council
The municipal council  of Nord-Fron is made up of 25 representatives that are elected to four year terms.  The party breakdown of the council is as follows:

Mayors
The mayors of Nord-Fron (incomplete list):
1977-1983: Tollef Beitrusten (Ap)
1984-2007: Gunnar Tore Stenseng (Ap)
2007-2011: Tove Haugli (Ap)
2011-2015: Olav Røssum (Sp)
2015–2021: Rune Støstad (Ap)
2021–present: Anne-Marie Olstad (Ap)

Attractions

Royal residence
The Royal Mountain Chalet, Prinsehytta is located in the Sikkilsdalen valley in Nord-Fron. It is used as a Royal residence by the Norwegian Royal Family for hunting trips as well as during the Easter and winter holidays.

Eidefoss petroglyphs
The Rock carvings at Eidefoss are located on the east side of the river south of the white water.

National parks
Rondane National Park, which lies partially in Nord-Fron, was the first Norwegian National Park, established on 21 December 1962. In 2003, Rondane National Park was enlarged and smaller areas of nature protection were opened or enlarged.
Jotunheim National Park is not technically in Nord-Fron, but its southern border brushes Nord-Fron's western border.

Sister cities
Nord-Fron has sister city agreements with the following places:
  - Hedemora, Dalarna County, Sweden
  - Richmond, North Yorkshire, England, United Kingdom

Notable people 
 Peder Per Veggum (1768 in Nord-Fron – 1836) a Norwegian artist and rose painter, a cabinet carpenter and woodcarver; associated with the decorative folk art of Rosemaling
 Ole Paulssøn Haagenstad (1775 in Fron – 1866) a Norwegian farmer and politician
 Jacob Smith Jarmann (1816 in Nord-Fron – 1894) a Norwegian firearms designer, invented the Jarmann M1884 rifle
 Hallstein Høgåsen (born 1937 in Nord-Fron) a Norwegian theoretical physicist, main field elementary particle physics 
 Grete Berget (1954 in Vinstra – 2017) a Norwegian politician and journalist
 Geir Helgemo (born 1970 in Vinstra) a professional bridge player, Monaco resident
 Øystein Skar (born 1985 in Vinstra) a Norwegian pianist and composer

References

External links

Municipal fact sheet from Statistics Norway 

Gudbrandsdalen
 
Municipalities of Innlandet
1851 establishments in Norway
1966 disestablishments in Norway
1977 establishments in Norway